Recorded on December 17, 2004, at the Launchpad in Albuquerque, New Mexico, Live. 03 is Isis's third live release. It is sourced from an audience bootleg recording, and as such, does not have professional sound quality.

This is the first live release to feature songs from 2004's Panopticon LP.

As with the rest of the live series, the CD version was self-released. The vinyl edition was handled, in this instance, by Profound Lore Records.  Along with all Isis' other live albums, it is set to be re-released on June 28, 2011 in digital format, almost a full year after Isis' dissolution. It marks the third of the series released to a fortnightly schedule.

Track listing
All songs written by Isis.

 "So Did We" – 8:43
 "Backlit" – 8:40
 "The Beginning and the End" – 9:24
 "In Fiction" – 10:15
 "Wills Dissolve" – 7:29
 "Grinning Mouths" – 8:51
 "Altered Course" – 15:38

Personnel
 Karl Frinkle – Live audio recording
 Nick Zampiello – Mastering
 Michael Babcock – Printing at Interrobang
 Jeff Caxide – Bass guitar
 Aaron Harris – drums
 Michael Gallagher – Guitar
 Bryant Clifford Meyer – Electronics, guitar
 Aaron Turner – vocals, guitar, design
 Greg Moss – Live sound

References

External links 
 Live III at Bandcamp (streamed copy where licensed)

Isis (band) live albums
Albums with cover art by Aaron Turner
2005 live albums
Profound Lore Records live albums